Stamped paper is an often-foolscap piece of paper which bears a pre-printed revenue stamp. Stamped papers are not a form of postal stationery. 

The use of stamped paper in the American colonies was so unpopular that it has been credited with sowing the seeds of the American Revolution.

Uses 
The stamped paper has been widely used around the world to collect taxes on documents requiring stampings, such as leases, agreements, receipts, court documents and many others. The papers are bought blank apart from the pre-printed stamp and are available from stationers, lawyers' offices, post offices and courts according to local regulations. The parties to the matter then write their legal business on the paper and lodge it with the court or other interested party. This is an efficient way of collecting taxes and stamping documents without the need to submit them to a separate government stamp office.

History 
Stamped paper is thought to have been a Spanish invention, being introduced (or reinvented) in the Netherlands in the 1620s. It has been used widely in France (from 1651), Great Britain (from 1694), the United States, India and elsewhere.

The 1765 Stamp Act required all British colonies in the New World to use stamped paper prepared in London and embossed with a revenue stamp. This led to riots and political agitation which have been credited with sowing the seeds of the American Revolution.

Collecting 
Collecting stamped paper is part of revenue philately.

Security measures 
The stamp sometimes occupies the entire width of the top part of the paper and is often of an intricate engraved design to enhance security. The paper will also frequently have a whole page watermark for the same reason.

Current uses 
Stamped papers remain in use in many countries; however, electronic versions are being developed to reduce the risk of fraud. This has particularly been the case in India following a large-scale fraud in the year 2000. The use of stamped paper remains an important source of revenue in some developing countries, like Bangladesh, where other forms of taxation are hard to collect.

See also 
 Abdul Karim Telgi, an Indian stamped paper counterfeiter

References

Further reading 
 Castenholz, Bill. Field Guide to Revenue Stamped Paper, Castenholz and Sons, Publishers, Pacific Palisades, California, United States.
 Einstein, Joseph; Thomas C. Kingsley and W. Richard DeKay. Handbook for United States Revenue Stamped Paper,  American Revenue Association, Inc., United States.
 Koeppel, Adolph. The Stamps that Caused the American Revolution, the stamps of the 1765 British Stamp Act for America, American Revolution Bicentennial Commission, New York, 1976.

External links 

 Embossed revenue stamp paper
 Essays based on the Wyon head intended for stamped paper submitted after 1839 by Charles Whiting
 United States Two-Cent Revenue Stamped Paper - The Civil War Designs

Philatelic terminology
Revenue stamps
Spanish inventions